Sri Krishna Medical College and Hospital (SKMCH) is situated in Muzaffarpur district in the Indian state of Bihar.Established in 1970, this college is approved by MCI.

About college
It is affiliated with Aryabhatta Knowledge University. SKMCH was setup by the leaders of Bhumihar (Babhan) Community Laliteshwar Prasad Shahi and Raghunath Pandey. It is the second largest medical college and hospital in North Bihar. The current capacity of MBBS seats in SKMCH is 125, which excludes major specialisation.

Location 
SKMCH is located 2.3 kilometres from Zero Mile.

See also

References

External links 
Aryabhatta Knowledge University
Sri Krishna Medical College and Hospital

Education in Muzaffarpur
Medical colleges in Bihar
Hospitals in Bihar
Muzaffarpur
Colleges affiliated to Aryabhatta Knowledge University
Educational institutions established in 1970
1970 establishments in Bihar